The Harmon–Neils House is a house located in northwest Portland, Oregon, listed on the National Register of Historic Places.

See also
 National Register of Historic Places listings in Northwest Portland, Oregon

References

1908 establishments in Oregon
A. E. Doyle buildings
Bungalow architecture in Oregon
Colonial Revival architecture in Oregon
Hillside, Portland, Oregon
Houses completed in 1908
Houses on the National Register of Historic Places in Portland, Oregon
Portland Historic Landmarks